These lists include all players who have made at least one appearance in a competitive match for the Bethlehem Steel FC since the team's first USL season in 2016. Players who have been listed on the team's roster but have not made any appearances are not listed.

Regular Season players
United League Soccer clubs are allowed a roster of 30 players at any one time during the USL season.

Outfield Players

Goalkeepers

Sources
Bethlehem Steel FC Statistics
Soccerway Statistics

 
Lists of soccer players by club in the United States
Association football player non-biographical articles